Daphnusa ailanti is a species of moth of the family Sphingidae. It is endemic to Sulawesi.

References

External links
The Sphingidae of Southeast-Asia

Smerinthini
Moths described in 1875